Radio Televisión Madrid S.A. (RTVM) is the public broadcaster of the Community of Madrid.

History 
The Ente Público Radio Televisión Madrid was created by means of a 1984 law, during the government of Joaquín Leguina, with the endorsement of all parliamentary forces. The Onda Madrid radio station began its broadcast on 18 February 1985. Telemadrid began its broadcast on 2 May 1989. In 2015, the regional government of Cristina Cifuentes lined up a plan to transform the ente público into a sociedad anónima. The sociedad anónima Radio Televisión Madrid was thus created in 2016 by means of a law passed by the Assembly of Madrid in December 2015, and the S.A. assumed full control over the regional broadcasting services on 17 March 2017, inheriting the assets of the Ente Público as well as Telemadrid and Onda Madrid, transferred by means of a merging by absorption.

Divisions

References 

Publicly funded broadcasters
Mass media companies of Spain
Television networks in Spain
Administration of the Community of Madrid
Mass media in the Community of Madrid
Companies based in the Community of Madrid